"Piano in the Dark" is a song by American singer-songwriter Brenda Russell (featuring backing vocals by Joe Esposito). It was the first single to be taken from Russell's 1988 album, Get Here.

Song information
Russell, believing "that in every title there's a song somewhere," made a habit of "collecting" interesting phrases she heard and placing them in a notebook for potential song titles. It was through this process that she wrote the lyrics to "Piano in the Dark" as the title seemed to fit with the music her co-writers sent her. In the early stages Russell did not understand what the title would refer to, eventually deciding it was about 
Initially "Gravity" was planned to be released as the first single, however Herb Alpert pushed to have "Piano" released instead, feeling that it better represented her as an artist.

"Piano in the Dark" was released in early 1988, nine years after Russell's previous charting single on the Billboard Hot 100 (1979's "So Good, So Right"). The song gained heavy airplay and became Russell's biggest hit, peaking at number 6 on the Billboard Hot 100, number 8 on the R&B Chart and number 3 on the Adult Contemporary Chart. The song was also a moderate hit in the UK, peaking at number 23.

The song earned Russell two Grammy Award nominations in 1989, including one for Song of the Year.

Music video
There are two music videos.  The first version, filmed in black-and-white, shows Brenda looking depressed in her apartment as she tosses cards in a derby and thinks about her lover, a long-haired blond man playing on the piano.  The second video was filmed in color and mostly shown in the US where a smiling Brenda is shown performing with her band (including Joe Esposito) in a dimly lit nightclub with many people during a thunderstorm at night.

Samples
The song uses the chorus lyrics from the song Piano in the Dark by Brenda Russell.

Charts

Year-end charts

References

Songs about musicians
Songs about pianos
1988 singles
Brenda Russell songs
Pop ballads
Contemporary R&B ballads
Soul ballads
Songs written by Scott Cutler
Songs written by Brenda Russell
Black-and-white music videos
1987 songs
A&M Records singles
Quiet storm songs
1980s ballads